The Bandits of Asnières (Germany: Die Banditen von Asnières) is a 1920 German silent crime film directed by Karl Mueller-Hagens and starring Max Landa, Reinhold Schünzel and .

Cast
 Max Landa as Der Detektiv
 Reinhold Schünzel as Jean, der Apache
  as die Frau

References

Bibliography

External links

1920 films
Films of the Weimar Republic
German silent feature films
German black-and-white films
1920 crime films
German crime films
1920s German films
1920s German-language films